Prince Milan Obrenović II of Serbia (21 October 1819 – 8 July 1839) was the ruling Prince of Serbia for just four weeks in 1839.

Early life
Milan Obrenović was the eldest son and heir of Miloš Obrenović I. He was ill from his earliest childhood and his health was poor throughout his entire life from tuberculosis. He was a student of the Belgrade Higher School, modern-day University of Belgrade. He had a full curriculum of study, including French and German languages. In 1830, when Serbia obtained its autonomy, Milan Obrenović became the designated heir of his father.

Prince of Serbia
His father Miloš Obrenović I abdicated on 13 June 1839 in favour of Milan. However, by then, Milan was already gravely ill with tuberculosis. He died on 8 July 1839, having never regained consciousness. After his death, his brother Mihailo Obrenović succeeded to the throne, as Mihailo Obrenović III. Later that year, the "first regency" was formed in Serbia. Since Prince Milan "ruled" for only 26 days, no public documents were issued under his name.

Milan Obrenović II was buried in the church of Palilula, and later his grave was moved to St. Mark's Church in Belgrade.

See also

 List of Serbian monarchs

References

1819 births
1839 deaths
People from Kragujevac
Milan
19th-century Serbian monarchs
Eastern Orthodox monarchs
Belgrade Higher School alumni
Burials at St. Mark's Church, Belgrade